Fucaria is a genus of sea snails, marine gastropod mollusks in the family Skeneidae.

Species
Species within the genus Fucaria include:
 Fucaria mystax Warén & Bouchet, 2001
 Fucaria striata Warén & Bouchet, 1993

References

 
Skeneidae
Gastropod genera